Bernardine is a Latinate diminutive of the given name "Bernard". It can be applied to men, notably Saint Bernadine, but is now much more often a female name. Bernadine and Bernadene are variant spellings of the female name.  

The nickname Bernie is unisex. Bernardine is uncommon as a surname. Emily Dickinson uses the word as an adjective: "A more Bernardine Girl...".

As a male given name
Saint Bernardino of Siena (1380–1444), Italian Franciscan missionary
Bernardino of Fossa (1420–1503), Italian Fransciscan historian, theologian and writer
Blessed Bernardine of Feltre (1439–1494), Italian Franciscan missionary
Bernardine a Piconio (1633–1709), French Capuchin theologian and exegete
Bernardine Dong Guangqing (1917–2007), Chinese bishop

As a female given name
Bernardine of Lippe (1563–1628), German countess
Bernardine Bishop (1939–2013), British author
Bernardine Dohrn (born 1942), American activist and law professor
Bernardine do Régo (born 1937), Beninese diplomat
Bernardine Evaristo (born 1959), British author and academic
Bernardine Flynn (1904–1977), American radio actress and announcer
Bernardine Hamaekers (1836–1912), Belgian soprano
Bernardine R. Leist (1880–1926), American screenwriter and actress
Bernardine Portenski (1949–2017), New Zealand long-distance runner

See also
Bernardines (disambiguation)
Bernardino (disambiguation)
Bernardin
Bernadine
Bernardini (disambiguation)
Bernardina

References